Piratininga crater is a  diameter circular feature in the Paraná Basin of São Paulo State in Brazil. It is a possible impact crater, but further investigation is needed to obtain more information on the structure. The Russian Academy of Sciences listed the structure as a probable impact crater in 2017, but as questionable in 2019.

Description 
The Piratininga crater is located in São Paulo State, Brazil. The structure was identified in the 1970s. The crater is heavily eroded and has a  topographic difference between the centre and rim of the crater. The structure is analysed with aeromagnetic and seismic surveys. The identified structures are not conclusive for an impact crater and more research is needed. Normal faults have been registered in the east of the structure with smaller faults located in the west. The age has been estimated at Cretaceous, and possibly the Aptian, around 117 Ma.

See also 
 List of possible impact structures on Earth
 List of impact craters in South America
 Cerro do Jarau crater
 Santa Marta crater

References

Bibliography 
 
 
 
 

Impact craters of Brazil
Possible impact craters on Earth
Cretaceous impact craters
Cretaceous Brazil
Craters